The United States District Court for the Northern District of Iowa (in case citations, N.D. Iowa) has jurisdiction over fifty-two of Iowa's ninety-nine counties. It is subject to the Eighth Circuit Court of Appeals (except for patent claims and claims against the U.S. government under the Tucker Act, which are appealed to the Federal Circuit).

Presently, the court has two district judges, Chief Judge Leonard T. Strand and Judge C. J. Williams, one senior judge, Linda R. Reade, and two magistrate judges, Kelly Mahoney and Mark A. Roberts.

The court is headquartered in Cedar Rapids, with a satellite courthouse in Sioux City.

, the Acting United States Attorney is Timothy T. Duax.

Jurisdiction 

The Northern District of Iowa has four court divisions, each covering the following counties:

The Cedar Rapids Division, covering Benton, Cedar, Grundy, Hardin, Iowa, Jones, Linn, and Tama counties.

The Central Division, covering Butler, Calhoun, Carroll, Cerro Gordo, Emmet, Franklin, Hamilton, Hancock, Humboldt, Kossuth, Palo Alto, Pocahontas, Webster, Winnebago, Worth, and Wright counties.

The Eastern Division, covering Allamakee, Black Hawk, Bremer, Buchanan, Chickasaw, Clayton, Delaware, Dubuque, Fayette, Floyd, Howard, Jackson, Mitchell, and Winneshiek counties.

The Western Division, covering Buena Vista, Cherokee, Clay, Crawford, Dickinson, Ida, Lyon, Monona, O'Brien, Osceola, Plymouth, Sac, Sioux, and Woodbury counties.

Current judges 
:

Former judges

Chief judges

Succession of seats

See also 
 Courts of Iowa
 List of current United States district judges
 List of United States federal courthouses in Iowa

References

External links 
 Main page
 Makeup
 US Attorney

Iowa, Northern District
Iowa law
Cedar Rapids, Iowa
Webster County, Iowa
Sioux City, Iowa
1882 establishments in Iowa
Courthouses in Iowa
Courts and tribunals established in 1882